Donald D. Doyle (February 6, 1915 – January 31, 2011) served in the California legislature and during World War II he served in the United States Marine Corps.

While serving in the California Assembly from January 5, 1953 - January 5, 1959, Doyle co-authored the Short-Doyle Mental Health Act with California Senator Alan Short and authored legislation creating the ferry boat transportation system between Benicia and Martinez.

References

External links
Join California Donald D. Doyle

United States Marine Corps personnel of World War II
1915 births
2011 deaths
20th-century American politicians
Republican Party members of the California State Assembly